Oswald is an extinct town in Atchison County, in the U.S. state of Missouri. The GNIS classifies it as a populated place.

A post office called Oswald was established in 1897, and remained in operation until 1901. The name Oswald may honor a local family.

References

Ghost towns in Missouri
Former populated places in Atchison County, Missouri